Walter Guillén Soto (6 December 1961) is a Honduran prelate of the Catholic Church and a member of the Salesians of Don Bosco who has been the Bishop of Gracias in Honduras since 2021.

Biography
Walter Guillén Soto was born in San Pedro Sula on 1961 and on 5 November 1988 he was ordained a Salesian priest.

On 14 November 2020, Pope Francis appointed him auxiliary bishop of Tegucigalpa and titular bishop of Nasbinca. On 27 April 2021, before Soto received his episcopal ordination, Pope Francis named him the first bishop of the Diocese of Gracias, which was established that same day.

Guillén received his episcopal consecration on 11 June 2021 from Archbishop Gábor Pintér,  Apostolic Nuncio to Honduras.

References

External links 
 

21st-century Roman Catholic bishops in Honduras
1961 births
People from San Pedro Sula
Salesian bishops
Living people
Roman Catholic bishops of Gracias